José Mba Nchama (born October 17, 1965) is an Equatoguinean judoka, who played for the half-middleweight category. At age forty-two, Nchama made his official debut for the 2008 Summer Olympics in Beijing, where he competed in the men's half-middleweight class (81 kg). He received a bye for the second preliminary match, before losing out by an automatic ippon and a kata-gatame (seven mat holds) to Montenegro's Srđan Mrvaljević.

References

External links

NBC Olympics Profile

Equatoguinean male judoka
Living people
Olympic judoka of Equatorial Guinea
Judoka at the 2008 Summer Olympics
1965 births